Jack Bishop (born c. 1948) is a former American football coach and college athletics administrator. He served as the head football coach at his alma mater, Southern Utah University, from 1978 to 1982 and again from 1986 to 1995, compiling a record of 80–74–4.

Bishop retired in 2013 after having served as the athletic director at Central Washington University.

Head coaching record

College

References

Year of birth missing (living people)
1940s births
Living people
Central Washington Wildcats athletic directors
Southern Utah Thunderbirds athletic directors
Southern Utah Thunderbirds football coaches
High school football coaches in Utah
Utah State University alumni